The Stanley Dynamic is a Canadian live-action/animated sitcom that premiered on YTV on March 19, 2015. The series stars Charles Vandervaart, Taylor Abrahamse, Madison Ferguson, Kate Hewlett, and Michael Barbuto. The show was nominated for a Canadian Screen Award for Best Writing in a Children's or Youth Program or Series. It was also a finalist at the 2016 Cynopsis Kids imagination Awards for Best New Series and won honorable mention in two categories.

Premise 
The series revolves around Larry and his animated twin brother Luke as they make their way through high school, as well as the rest of the Stanley family, including Lori, Luke and Larry's genius little sister, Lane, their cartoonist father, and Lisa, their caterer mother.

Characters

Main 
  (Taylor Abrahamse) is the animated twin brother of Larry Stanley and older brother to Lori Stanley. He's the only animated character in the family, though this is rarely acknowledged by the others. He enjoys LARP-ing (Live-Action Role Playing), and is shown to be bad at sports. He's able to stretch his limbs and is very flexible, though it's painful to do so. He's also able to change his clothes quickly simply by spinning quickly.
  (Charles Vandervaart) is the live-action twin brother of Luke Stanley and older brother to Lori Stanley. He's a member of the school football team, an attention seeker, and is shown to not understand many things, especially sarcasm and irony.
  (Madison Ferguson) is the genius little sister of Luke and Larry Stanley. She's shown to be the smartest of the family. She's passionate for entomology, and loves to take advantage of her two older brothers.
  (Kate Hewlett) is the mother of Luke, Larry, and Lori Stanley, as well as a caterer at the Brockdale Community Centre.
  (Michael Barbuto) is the father of Luke, Larry, and Lori Stanley, as well as a cartoonist.

Recurring 
  (Josette Jorge) is the administrator of the Brockdale Community Centre.
  (Bill Turnbull) is the caretaker of the Brockdale Community Centre.
  (Chelsea Clark) is the love interest of Luke and Larry. (season 1)
  (Isaiah Lee) is Larry’s friend on the football team.
  (Eliana Jones) is Luke and Larry’s friend and neighbor who’s the athletic director at the Brockdale Community Centre.
  (Michael Gross) is the grandfather of Luke, Larry, and Lori Stanley, and Lisa Stanley's father.
  (Natalie Ganzhorn) is a schoolmate of Luke and Larry.
  (Graeme Jokic) is a schoolmate of Luke and Larry.
  (Tamina Pollack-Paris) is Darnell’s sister who has a crush on Larry. (season 2)

Guest appearances
 David Hewlett as astronaut Glenn Cooper
 Alan Thicke as himself
 Jaleel White as Principal Webber
 Munro Chambers as Rupert
 Neil Crone as Officer Ben
 Charlie Storwick as herself

Episodes

Season 1

Notes

References

External links
 
 

2015 Canadian television series debuts
2017 Canadian television series endings
2010s Canadian high school television series
2010s Canadian teen sitcoms
YTV (Canadian TV channel) original programming
Canadian television series with live action and animation
English-language television shows
Television series about brothers
Television series about families
Television series about teenagers